New South Africa Party is a minor political party in South Africa.

The party aims to introduce what it calls a "sober service grant", replacing child grants. The grant would be available to all that are unemployed or earn less than R2000 a month, and to be eligible, recipients would need to be free from gangsterism, drugs and alcohol, and render 20 hours of monthly community service.

The party contested the 2019 South African general election at the provincial level in Western Cape only, failing to win a seat.

Election results

Provincial elections

! rowspan=2 | Election
! colspan=2 | Eastern Cape
! colspan=2 | Free State
! colspan=2 | Gauteng
! colspan=2 | Kwazulu-Natal
! colspan=2 | Limpopo
! colspan=2 | Mpumalanga
! colspan=2 | North-West
! colspan=2 | Northern Cape
! colspan=2 | Western Cape
|-
! % !! Seats
! % !! Seats
! % !! Seats
! % !! Seats
! % !! Seats
! % !! Seats
! % !! Seats
! % !! Seats
! % !! Seats
|-
! 2019
| - || -
| - || -
| - || -
| - || -
| - || -
| - || -
| - || -
| - || -
| 0.02% || 0/42
|}

References

Political parties in South Africa